Xingzhong Road is a station on Shanghai Metro Line 9. It began operation on December 29, 2007.  It is located at Caobao Road and Xingzhong Road.

Railway stations in Shanghai
Shanghai Metro stations in Minhang District
Railway stations in China opened in 2007
Line 9, Shanghai Metro